The International Investment Bank (IIB) is a multilateral development institution with headquarters in Budapest, Hungary. IIB was established in 1970 under the auspices of Comecon and operates as an international organisation based on the intergovernmental Agreement Establishing the International Investment Bank dated 10 June 1970, registered with the United Nations Secretariat on 1 December 1971 under number 11417, as amended and restated from time to time.

IIB specialises in medium- and long-term financing of projects aimed at supporting the economies of its members that would have a significant positive social, economic and environmental impact. IIB offers direct financing and provides loans in partnership with other financial institutions as well as through partner banks.

Initially made it up of all Warsaw Pact members led by the Soviet Union alongside Cuba, Mongolia and Vietnam under the Eastern Bloc during the Cold War, IIB's membership was largely maintained until that point. East Germany withdrew from the IIB in 1990 following German reunification, Poland left in 2000 prior to joining the European Union and the Czech Republic and Slovakia (formerly part of Czechoslovakia) exited the organization in 2022 following the Russian invasion of Ukraine with Bulgaria and Romania to follow. This leaves Hungary and Russia to be the remaining European members of IIB.

Member states

Current members
  (1970–2023) (leaves August 15, 2023)
 
 
 
  (1970–2023) (leaves June 9, 2023)

Former members
  (1993–2022)
  (1970–1993)
  (1970–1990)
  (1970–2000)
  (1993–2022)
  (1970–1991)

The IIB statutory documents allow for the admission of either sovereign states or international organisations as members.

Management 
The Board of Governors is the Bank's supreme collective governing body, consisting of representatives from the IIB's member states. The board of directors is responsible for the general management of the Bank. The Bank's executive body is the Management Board, whose members are appointed by the Board of Governors. The Bank's activities are controlled by the Audit committee, which is made up of representatives from the IIB's member states appointed by the Board of Governors. The Bank's Financial statements are confirmed by a half-year compliance Audit review and an annual audit conducted by international auditors EY.

Connections to Russian spy operations 
With the relocation of IIB's headquarters to EU-member Hungary, critics raised that the bank serves as a "Trojan horse" for Russian intelligence operations and spy activities against the European Union. This claim is supported by the fact that the bank's chief Nikolai Kosov’s has close ties with Russian intelligence agencies, and that his father was a KGB top operative in Budapest in 1970s, while his mother was described as “one of the most extraordinary spies of the 20th century”. Kosov has rejected this claim. 

Hungary's Russia-friendly government was also criticised for providing privileges to the IIB, including diplomatic immunity to its staff and exclusion from any regulatory supervision in Hungary.

History

Soviet era 
The agreement establishing the IIB was signed by the member states on 10 July 1970 and registered with the UN Secretariat under number 11417. The Bank began its activities on 1 January 1971. The member states of the Bank at the time of its foundation were: the People's Republic of Bulgaria, the People's Republic of Hungary, the German Democratic Republic, the Mongolian Democratic Republic, the People's Republic of Poland, the Socialist Republic of Romania, the Union of Soviet Socialist Republics, and the Czechoslovak Socialist Republic.

Post-Communist era 
In 2019, IIB relocated its headquarters from Moscow, Russia to Budapest, Hungary.

Following the 2022 Russian invasion of Ukraine, the Czech Republic announced it would speed up its planned departure from the IIB, and Romania started the process to withdraw as well. Bulgaria terminated its membership in the IIB, too

References

External links 
 

Multilateral development banks
Banks established in 1970
Supranational banks
Comecon
Banks of the Soviet Union